is The Brilliant Green's seventh single, released in 1999. It peaked at #9 on the Oricon singles chart.

Track listing

Cover Versions
The song was covered by Tommy february6 and appeared as a b-side on the Be My Valentine (Lovely Valentine's Day) single. The cover also appeared on her Tommy Candy Shop Sugar Me album.

References

1999 singles
The Brilliant Green songs
1999 songs
Sony Music Entertainment Japan singles
Songs written by Tomoko Kawase
Songs written by Shunsaku Okuda